Teladoc Health, Inc. is a multinational telemedicine and virtual healthcare company headquartered in the United States. Primary services include telehealth, medical opinions, AI and analytics, telehealth devices and licensable platform services. In particular, Teladoc Health uses telephone and videoconferencing software as well as mobile apps to provide on-demand remote medical care. Billed as the first and largest telemedicine company in the United States, Teladoc Health was launched in 2002 and has acquired companies such as BetterHelp in 2015, Best Doctors in 2017, and Advance Medical in 2018. It trades on the NYSE and in 2019 was active in 130 countries and served around 40 million members in 2021.

History

2002–2008 
Teladoc was founded in 2002 in Dallas, Texas by G. Byron Brooks EE MD and Michael Gorton. Billing itself as the oldest telemedicine company in United States, Teladoc's initial business model allowed patients to remotely consult with state-licensed doctors at any time. Companies paid a monthly fee for their employees to access the service, while patients paid a flat fee for each consultation, originally about $35 to $40. With Gorton as both chairman and CEO, Teladoc launched nationally in 2005 at the Consumer Directed Health Care Conference in Chicago, Illinois. Teladoc had around 1 million members by the end of 2007, with large employers such as AT&T providing the service to employees as a health benefit.

2009–2014 

Jason Gorevic was named Teladoc's chief executive in 2009. The company's initial private funding rounds raised $9 million in December 2009, $4 million in January 2011, and $18.6 million in September 2011. That year, Aetna began offering Teladoc for its fully insured members in Florida and Texas, later offering Teladoc in all 50 states. Teladoc acquired Consult A Doctor for $16.6 million cash in August 2013, allowing smaller companies to access Teladoc's services. At the time, Teladoc completed 120,000 consults annually. Teladoc raised $15 million in September 2013, with total funding at that point equaling $46.6 million.

The Affordable Care Act led to a large number of insurance companies signing with Teladoc, resulting in a growth surge around 2014. By that time, insurance companies such as Blue Shield of California and Oscar had signed with Teladoc, as well as other companies such as Home Depot, T-Mobile, CalPERS, and Rent-A-Center. Teladoc acquired AmeriDoc for $17.2 million in May 2014. The acquisitions of Consult A Doctor and AmeriDoc, both Teladoc's main competitors, resulted in Teladoc becoming the largest telemedicine provider in the United States. With 8 million individual patients, Teladoc's doctors performed 299,000 consults that year. Teladoc's sales doubled in both 2013 and 2014, and Teladoc raised $50 million from private investors in September 2014, bringing total funding to $100 million.

2015–2016 

The company acquired BetterHelp in January 2015 for $3.5 million, followed by Stat Health Services, Inc. (StatDoc) in June 2015 for $30 million. After beginning the process that April, Teladoc went public on the New York Stock Exchange on July 1, 2015. The only telemedicine company on the NYSE, Teladoc's initial public offering listed at $19 per share, giving the company a market capitalization of $758 million and an enterprise value of $620 million. The initial response to the IPO was positive, as shares surged 50 percent on the opening day. Three months after the IPO, health insurer Highmark, which represented 1.5% of Teladoc's 2015 revenue, ceased to renew a contract. Teladoc shares fell significantly as a result, before rising to earlier levels.

Teladoc acquired the behavioral health services provider Compile Inc. in January 2015, followed by the competitor Stat Health Services Inc. in June 2015. In 2016 Teladoc began aggressively expanding, acquiring other companies and launching health segments for dermatology, behavioral health, and sexual health. That year the company won a patent infringement lawsuit filed against competitor American Well. In July 2016, Teladoc acquired HealthiestYou for $45 million. Teladoc had 15 million members by November 2016  and a market share of 75% in the United States. It also operated its full service suite in 48 states, excluding Arkansas and Texas. In December 2016, the American Hospital Association exclusively endorsed Teladoc's telehealth technology platform. Teladoc logged 952,000 patient visits that year.

2017–2021 

In its largest acquisition at the time, in 2017 Teladoc spent $440 million purchasing Best Doctors, a medical consultation firm and provider of medical second opinions and pay-to-play medical award listings. On February 28, 2019, non-profit group ProPublica released a report critical of companies like subsidiary Best Doctors that sell physician awards, including "Best Doctors" awards. Teladoc had 7,500 clients in 2017, of which 220 were Fortune 1000 companies. Sales that year were $233 million, 89% higher than the year prior.

As of July 2018, Teladoc Health brands included Teladoc, Advance Medical, Best Doctors, BetterHelp and HealthiestYou. With a market capitalization of $4.1 billion, on August 10, 2018, Teladoc, Inc. changed its name to Teladoc Health, Inc. while continuing to trade on the NYSE. Teladoc Health began partnering with CVS in August 2018 on remote consults at MinuteClinics. 

In December 2018, Teladoc Health's chief financial officer and chief operating officer Mark Hirschhorn resigned after a report that he engaged in a sexual relationship and insider trading with an employee. According to Yahoo Finance, stock value fell roughly 20% in the days following, while an investor class action lawsuit alleged that Teladoc Health had violated securities laws by failing to disclose Hirschhorn's behavior. Teladoc Health denied making false statements or any legal violations. Joining from American Express, Mala Murthy was appointed CFO in June 2019.

In late 2018, Teladoc Health acquired the telemedicine company Advance Medical for $352 million, which employed doctors in Latin America, Europe, and Asia. In 2019, the French health company MédecinDirect was acquired.

Teladoc Health provides free telehealth visits to natural disaster and hurricane victims, and in 2019 it provided the telemedicine system implemented for patients in Paradise, California after the Camp Fire, working through Blue Shield of California. In April 2019, Teladoc launched in Canada with the Teladoc Telemedicine Service. In May 2019, the company created a virtual care patient safety organization (PSO) dubbed the Institute for Patient Safety and Quality of Virtual Care. Currently headquartered in Purchase, New York, as of 2019, the company was active in 130 countries and had around 27 million members. David Sides was appointed Chief operating officer in 2019. In 2019, the company had revenues of $533 million and 4.1 million total visits.

In January 2020, Teladoc announced that it was acquiring InTouch Health for both cash and stock. Closing the deal in July 2020, Teladoc predicted that its "hospital-based telemedicine business" would grow significantly as a result. In March 2020, Teladoc was "partnering with the CDC to provide near real-time surveillance data on the spread of the [novel coronavirus]." By July 2020, Teladoc's reported revenue was up 85% from 2019, with its paid US membership doubled from 26.8 million to 51.5 million.

In August 2020, the business announced it would acquire Livongo Health for $18.5 billion. It was the "third-largest deal for a U.S. company" that year, with the combined companies to have a joint enterprise value of around $37 billion.

Services and business model 
Teladoc Health divides its services into six categories: platform and program services, guidance and support, expert medical services, mental health services, telehealth, and integrated virtual care. As a software company, Teladoc Health is involved with artificial intelligence, analytics, telehealth devices and "licensable platform services." The company  uses telephone and videoconferencing software to provide on-demand remote medical care,  with patients able to log on to the service at any time and be connected with a board-certified, state-licensed physician within several minutes.

The company's physicians treat non-emergencies such as the flu, pink eye, infections, sinus issues, mental health issues, and dermatological conditions, among others. The company has an expert network of 55,000 involved in 450 medical subspecialties.  While medication can be prescribed remotely, physicians do not prescribe narcotics or "lifestyle" drugs such as Viagra, and refer some cases to clinics or emergency rooms. In 2014, Teladoc Health reported that it sent around 1% of consultations to the emergency room, and around 6% to a primary care physician or urgent care center. In 2019, the company also claimed that 92% of medical issues were resolved after the first visit. Physicians overall follow "more than 100 proprietary clinical guidelines" developed by Teladoc Health, and are prohibited from physically meeting their telemedicine patients. Teams of nurses review around 10% of each physician's consults monthly.

Contracting largely with insurers and large employers, Teladoc Health generates revenue through a yearly or monthly fee charged per subscriber, as well as a fee for individual consults. Some companies waive or subsidize the consult fee for their employees. Teladoc Health has around 3,100 licensed physicians and nurses and services offered in about 30 languages. 
By July 2020, the company stated it served "60 of the top 100 hospitals," with telemedical robots being used at hospitals such as Providence Regional Medical Center in Everett, Washington and Sheba Medical Center in Israel, minimizing the potential spread of coronavirus.

Lobbying and legislation 
Teladoc Health has been involved in lobbying for legislation in several states. In 2015 the Texas Medical Board ruled that state physicians had to physically meet patients before remotely treating ailments or prescribing medication. The bill undermined Teladoc Health's business model in Texas, where it had around 2 million subscribers. Teladoc Health sued in federal court over the rule in Teladoc v. Texas Medical Board, arguing the bill violated antitrust laws by inflating prices and limiting the supply of health care providers in the state. The bill, meant to go active on June 3, 2015, was stalled while the lawsuit went through a federal appeals court, allowing Teladoc Health to continue operating in Texas in the interim. Teladoc voluntarily dropped the lawsuit in 2017 after Texas passed a new bill allowing for remote treatment without a prior in-person interaction, which Teladoc Health had lobbied heavily for.

In January 2019, Teladoc Health opposed a telemedicine bill proposed by the North Dakota Board of Medicine, which required telemedicine providers to perform initial video examinations or have initial exams done by another physician. Proponents argued the bill protected patients, while Teladoc Health and critics argued it decreased access to healthcare in rural areas. The year prior, Teladoc Health had completed 1,500 virtual visits in the state.

See also 
Electronic consultation
Health care in the United States
Online doctor

References

External links 
 

2015 initial public offerings
Companies based in Purchase, New York
Companies listed on the New York Stock Exchange
Health care companies established in 2002
Telemedicine